"Lyudi Invalidy" (Cyrillic: "Люди-инвалиды"; translation: Disabled People) is a promotional single from t.A.T.u.'s second Russian studio album of the same name. It was released only in Russia to promote the Russian release of the album. The single did not receive much attention worldwide, nor success on the Russian Airplay Charts, though a music video was filmed.

Music video
The video starts with t.A.T.u. walking through a club that shows much of the "lifeless immorality" that the song is about. The video was directed by James Cox, and it was shot in an alley in Los Angeles. The homeless living in the alley were asked to leave for the filming, and the street had to be highly chlorinated because of the smell of urine. After the side street smelled more or less satisfactory, another difficulty emerged: part of the crew appeared to be very sensitive to chlorine and had to wear respirators until the end of the shooting.

Little known at the time, actress Ashley Greene of Twilight fame appeared in the video. On The Best DVD, parts of the making of this video are shown, but played off as being the making of All About Us.

Track listing
Russia Maxi-CD single
 "Люди-инвалиды" (Album version)
 "Люди-инвалиды" (Radio Edit)
 "Люди-инвалиды" (Globass Remix)
 "Люди-инвалиды" (Pimenov Radio Mix)
 "Люди-инвалиды" (Pimenov Extended Mix)
 "Люди-инвалиды" (Globass Extended Club Mix)
 "All About Us"

Russia Promo CD single
 "Люди-инвалиды"
 "Люди-инвалиды" (Bez Lyubvi Pimenov PPK Mix)
 "Обезьянка ноль"

Charts

References

External links
 Official Lyrics (In Cyrillic)

T.A.T.u. songs
2005 singles
Songs written by Valery Polienko
Russian-language songs
2005 songs
Songs written by Ivan Shapovalov